"Turn Me On" is the debut single of Vincentian singer Kevin Lyttle. It was the lead single from his self-titled debut album. The song was originally a soca ballad released in 2003, remade into a dance hit for the US release. Featuring Spragga Benz in the radio remix, "Turn Me On" became a worldwide hit, reaching number one in Denmark and peaking within the top 10 in 16 other countries.

Song information
The song interpolates "All My Love", a song by R&B group 112 from their album Room 112. The remix features additional lyrics performed by Spragga Benz.

Various remixes of the song exist. Some radio stations played the pop mix with added drums or a 'Bubbling/Part II' remix by DJ Lipe (Santiago, Chile), featuring additional female vocals. There have also been several reggaeton remixes of the song including one featuring Ivy Queen. A 'Mad Hatters Ball' remix featuring Alison Hinds was also released. In 2008, the song was re-recorded with Hinds for Lyttle's second album, Fyah.

The song performed well on the Billboard Hot 100, peaking at number four on 14 August and staying in the chart for months. It was also successful worldwide, reaching number two in the United Kingdom for two weeks (being the best selling non-new entry song twice), number one in Denmark, and number three in Australia, and remains Lyttle's biggest hit to date.

The song was included on Billboards "12 Best Dancehall & Reggaeton Choruses of the 21st Century" at number one.

Track listingsUK CD single "Turn Me On" (UK mix) – 3:12
 "Turn Me On" (radio edit featuring Spragga Benz) – 3:21
 "Turn Me On" (original mix) – 3:21
 "Turn Me On" (video featuring Spragga Benz)UK 12-inch singleA1. "Turn Me On" (UK mix) – 3:12
B1. "Turn Me On" (radio edit featuring Spragga Benz) – 3:21
B2. "Turn Me On" (original instrumental) – 3:21European CD single "Turn Me On" (radio mix)
 "Turn Me On" (featuring Spragga Benz)Australian CD single "Turn Me On" (UK mix) – 3:12
 "Turn Me On" (radio edit featuring Spragga Benz) – 3:21
 "Turn Me On" (original mix) – 3:21US 7-inch singleA. "Turn Me On" (album version) – 3:13
B. "Turn Me On" (remix featuring Spragga Benz) – 3:20US 12-inch single'''
A1. "Turn Me On" (album version) – 3:13
A2. "Turn Me On" (club mix) – 3:58
A3. "Turn Me On" (album instrumental) – 3:13
B1. "Turn Me On" (remix featuring Spragga Benz) – 3:20
B2. "Turn Me On" (remix instrumental) – 3:20

Charts

Weekly charts

Year-end charts

Certifications

Release history

Cover versions
"Turn Me On" has been covered by numerous artists, including Himanshu Suri, 2Play & Raghav, Jay Sean, and CocoRosie. There was also a female response from 2Play called "Got Me Wrong".

The song was covered by American DJ trio Cheat Codes and Dutch DJ Dante Klein, in their 2016 single "Let Me Hold You (Turn Me On)", released on Spinnin' Records.

In January 2017, a revamped Latin version was released by Colombian singer AstrA under the title "Turn Me On Fuego" featuring Kevin Lyttle himself and Costi on the Cortes Entertainment label. The recording is a bilingual version in English and Spanish.

In July 2017, the song was interpolated by Bosnian singer Maya Berović in her song "Balmain" that features Bosnian rappers Jala Brat and Buba Corelli, who are signed as the authors, and is included in Berović's fifth studio album Viktorijina tajna''.

The song was interpolated by American singer Chris Brown, in his 2017 single "Questions", released on RCA.

The 2018 song "Mami Te Quiero" by Dezine and Diyun featuring Kayla interpolates the chorus of "Turn Me On". In 2021, "Mami Te Quiero" was sampled in "Ue'i Ho Sino (Fokaa Jr) Mega Mix" by DJ Noiz, which became popular in zumba culture.

References

2003 songs
2003 debut singles
2Play songs
Atlantic Records singles
Ivy Queen songs
Kevin Lyttle songs
Music videos directed by Director X
Number-one singles in Denmark
Raghav songs
Reggae fusion songs
Song recordings produced by RedOne
Songs written by Daron Jones
Songs written by Quinnes Parker
Songs written by Slim (singer)